Evjemoen was a Norwegian military camp in use from 1912 to 2002. The camp lies south of the village of Evje in Evje og Hornnes municipality in Agder county. From 1953 to 1995, Evjemoen was used as a training area for the Infanteriets øvingsavdeling II (IØ2). The camp was retired in December 2002.

History 
Evjemoen was established in 1912 for the Rogaland Infantry Regiment (IR8) during the First World War. During the Second World War, the Germans occupied and enlarged the camp. Evjemoen served as a Norwegian military camp and a boot camp for the infantry until the closure in 2002.

In 1979-1980, the future Norwegian prime minister and Secretary General of NATO, Jens Stoltenberg served his military conscription at Evjemoen.

Environment 

Timeline 
 1912–1918: Evjemoen established. It was tied to the Setesdal Line for rail service.
 1921–1939: Evjemoen was used as a training and drill center. 
 1940–1945: The Germans occupied and expanded the camp using Russian prisoners of war. The Russians were quartered in the original Norwegian camp.
 2002: camp closed.

External links
 Landsverneplan for Forsvaret (Evjemoen)

Norwegian Army bases
Setesdal
Military installations in Agder
Evje og Hornnes